Pristimantis latidiscus is a species of frog in the family Strabomantidae.
It is found in Colombia, Ecuador, and possibly Panama.
Its natural habitats are tropical moist lowland forests and moist montane forests.
It is threatened by habitat loss.

References

latidiscus
Amphibians of Colombia
Amphibians of Ecuador
Amphibians described in 1898
Taxonomy articles created by Polbot